Pipra Bhagwanpur is a village development committee in Rautahat District in the Province No. 2 of south-eastern Nepal. At the time of the 1991 Nepal census it had a population of 3698 people living in 715 individual households.

References

Populated places in Rautahat District